The Pythia is an ancient Greek priestess at the Oracle of Apollo at Delphi.

Pythia may also refer to:
 Pythia (drag queen)

In science
 432 Pythia, a main belt asteroid named after the Greek priestess
 PYTHIA, a particle physics event generator
 Pythia (gastropod), a genus of gastropods in the family Ellobiidae
Pythia (machine learning), an ancient text restoration deep neural network model.

In fiction
 Pythia (Battlestar Galactica), a fictional character from the new Battlestar Galactica
 Pythia of Gallifrey, a fictional character from the British TV series Doctor Who

In music
 Pythia (band), a British symphonic metal band

See also
 Pythia Island, Antarctica